Mubarak Al Besher (born 15 July 1988, in Dubai) is an Emirati swimmer. At the 2012 Summer Olympics, he competed in the Men's 100 metre breaststroke, finishing in 42nd place in the heats, failing to reach the semifinals.

References

Emirati male swimmers
Living people
Olympic swimmers of the United Arab Emirates
Swimmers at the 2012 Summer Olympics
Male breaststroke swimmers
Swimmers at the 2006 Asian Games
Swimmers at the 2010 Asian Games
Swimmers at the 2014 Asian Games
1988 births
People from Dubai
Asian Games competitors for the United Arab Emirates